The Vietnam Economic and Cultural Office in Taipei (Vietnamese: Văn phòng Kinh tế Văn hoá Việt Nam) is the representative office of Vietnam in Taiwan, which functions as a de facto embassy in the absence of diplomatic relations. Its counterpart body in Vietnam is the Taipei Economic and Cultural Office in Vietnam based in Hanoi.

History
The Office was established in 1993.  This followed visits to Vietnam by the Sino-Vietnamese Industrial and Commercial Association (SVICA) and China External Trade Development Council (CETRA) in 1991, and there was also provision for a branch office being established in Kaohsiung.

Before 1975, South Vietnam recognised Taiwan as the Republic of China, and had an embassy in Taipei. Nguyễn Văn Kiểu, brother of President Nguyễn Văn Thiệu, served as minister counsellor at the embassy. He was later made ambassador. On 25 April 1975, only five days before the Fall of Saigon, Thieu flew to Taipei. In 1976, South Vietnam was reunified with the Communist-controlled North, which had maintained full diplomatic relations with the People's Republic of China.

See also
Taiwan–Vietnam relations
List of diplomatic missions in Taiwan
List of diplomatic missions of Vietnam

References

1993 establishments in Taiwan
Organizations established in 1993
Vietnam
Taiwan–Vietnam relations
Diplomatic missions of Vietnam